Tocofersolan (INN) or tocophersolan, also referred to as TPGS (for tocopherol polyethylene glycol succinate), is a synthetic water-soluble version of vitamin E. Natural forms of vitamin E are fat soluble, but not water-soluble. Tocofersolan is polyethylene glycol derivative of α-tocopherol that enables water solubility.

Tocofersolan is used as a vitamin E supplement or to treat vitamin E deficiency in individuals who cannot absorb fats due to disease.
On 24 July 2009 the European Medicines Agency approved tocofersolan under the trade name Vedrop 50 mg/ml oral solution for the treatment of vitamin E deficiency due to digestive malabsorption in paediatric patients with congenital or hereditary chronic cholestasis, from birth (in term newborns) to 16 or 18 years of age (depending on the region).

Tocofersolan is also used in cosmetics and pharmaceuticals as an antioxidant.

References

External links 
 

Vitamin E
X